Peter Core is a former senior Australian public servant and policymaker.

Background and early life
Peter Core was schooled at the James Ruse Agricultural High School in New South Wales.
He then studied for a Master of Economics and a Bachelor of Rural Science from the University of New England.

Career
In 1993 Core was appointed Secretary of the Department of Industrial Relations, promoted from his role as a Deputy Secretary in the Department of Primary Industries and Energy. He entered the role at a time of significant change, with the Minister for Industrial Relations Laurie Brereton planning a major re-write of the Industrial Relations Act.

Core shifted to a role as Secretary of the Department of Transport in 1995. The following year, Core's appointment was one of six secretary appointments terminated following the election of the Howard Government. 

He served as Managing Director of the Rural Industries Research and Development Corporation from 1996 to 2002 and afterwards became Chief Executive Officer of the Australian Centre for International Agricultural Research.

Core is a member of the National Capital Authority.

References

Australian public servants
Living people
Year of birth missing (living people)
People from Sydney
University of New England (Australia) alumni